Shigu railway station is a railway station serving the village of Shigu in Tangxia, Dongguan, Guangdong, China. It is a station on the Guangzhou–Shenzhen railway and the Beijing–Kowloon railway, and rated level 4 on the Chinese Ministry of Railways station scale. It was opened in 1911, and is now managed by the Guangshen Railway Company.

Buildings and structures in Dongguan
Railway stations in China opened in 1911
Stations on the Beijing–Kowloon Railway
Stations on the Guangzhou–Shenzhen Railway